Ornativalva acutivalva is a moth of the family Gelechiidae. It was described by Sattler in 1976. It is found in Mongolia.

The wingspan is 5–6 mm. Adults have been recorded on wing in July.

The host plant is unknown, but might be a Tamarix species.

References

Moths described in 1976
Ornativalva